Dunsinane Falls (or Pundalu Oya Falls) (Sinhala: ඩන්සිනන් දියඇල්ල) is a waterfall in Nuwara Eliya District of Sri Lanka. It is situated in Pundaluoya village and between the Tea estates known as Dunsinan and Sheen. Therefore sometimes this falls is called as Dunsinane Sheen falls. The waterfall is created by the Pundalu Oya river which is a tributary of Kotmale Oya.

See also
 List of waterfalls of Sri Lanka
 Waterfalls in Sri Lanka

References

External links 
 YouTube Video

Landforms of Nuwara Eliya District
Landforms of Central Province, Sri Lanka
Tourist attractions in Central Province, Sri Lanka
Waterfalls in Central Province, Sri Lanka